My Outlaw Brother is a 1951 American Western film directed by Elliott Nugent, produced by Benedict Bogeaus, and starring Mickey Rooney, Wanda Hendrix, Robert Preston and Robert Stack. Filmed in Mexico and released through Eagle-Lion Classics, the picture is based on the book South of the Rio Grande by Max Brand and is sometimes referred to as My Brother, the Outlaw.

Plot 
Denny O'Moore, an Irish lad from New York, has not seen big brother Patrick for eight years. Patrick is said to now own a silver mine in Mexico and sends welcome money to his family in America.

In the town of Border City, Texas, a bandit known as "El Tigre" blows up and robs a bank. El Tigre is a dangerous killer with a large gang wanted on both sides of the border. The Mexican Secret Service who have attempted to infiltrate El Tigre's gang have had all of their operatives killed or disappeared. Their representative approaches the Texas Rangers with a plan. El Tigre's right-hand man is an American, Patrick O'Moore. The Mexicans assume that if a Ranger approaches O'Moore and gets him back to America he would be willing to betray El Tigre for money and amnesty. Ranger Joe Warder is assigned to go to Mexico and bring O'Moore across the border.

On the trail, bandits attack Denny but he is saved by Joe. Discovering Denny's brother is the man he is after, Joe teams up with Denny and ride together to San Clemente, Mexico where Patrick resides. Denny discovers a woman there, Carmelita Alvarado, is loved by Patrick but wants nothing to do with him.

Denny is seized by El Tigre's men, but keeping out of Denny's view, Patrick saves him. Patrick tells the men he has no brother, but orders his men not to harm Danny and return him to the United States unharmed. Patrick later finds Danny and tells him he owes his life to El Tigre, who once saved it.

After being held captive, Denny, Joe and Carmelita flee. A friend who helps them escape is killed by El Tigre, who comes at Denny with a machete. Joe shoots him. El Tigre is revealed to be Patrick in disguise.

The Americans ride off for home, and Carmelita decides to go along with Denny.

Cast
 Mickey Rooney as J. Dennis "Denny" O'Moore
 Wanda Hendrix as Señorita Carmelita Alvarado
 Robert Preston as Joe Warder
 Robert Stack as Patrick O'Moore
 José Torvay as Enrique Ortiz
 Carlos Múzquiz as Col. Sanchez (El Capitan)
 Fernando Wagner as Burger
 Hilda Moreno as Señora Alvarado

References

External links 

1951 films
American black-and-white films
1951 Western (genre) films
Films directed by Elliott Nugent
Films based on American novels
Films based on Western (genre) novels
Eagle-Lion Films films
Films shot in Mexico
American Western (genre) films
1950s English-language films
1950s American films